Tom Kåre Staurvik (born 13 February 1970 in Bodø) is a Norwegian football coach, who is working as a player developer for  the women's team Grand Bodø. As a player, he won the Norwegian Premier League and the Norwegian Cup several times, in addition to gaining 2 national team caps.

Career
Staurvik had a long active playing career behind him, as a defender and central midfielder, where he played for Bodø/Glimt, Rosenborg, NAC Breda, Shanghai Shenhua F.C., GIF Sundsvall and Fauske/Sprint, before he retired in 2004. After his retirement he had a short spell as playing coach at Harstad in Norwegian Second Division.

Tom Kåre Staurvik was capped two times. He made his debut for Norway in the 7–0 win away against Faroe Islands, when he replaced Erik Mykland at half time.

Coaching career
Staurvik was assistant coach of Bodø/Glimt in the 2012 season. In 2013, he was hired as player developer for the women's team Grand Bodø.

Honours
Bodø/Glimt
Tippeligaen:  Runner-up 1993
Norwegian Football Cup:  Winner 1993

Rosenborg
Tippeligaen:  Winner 1995, Winner 1996
Norwegian Football Cup:  Winner 1995

References

External links
 
 
 Tom Kåre Staurvik at AltOmFotball.no
 Norwegian footballers abroad in Hoelseth's Football World at hoelseth.com
 
 Tom Kåre Staurvik at RBKmedia.no

1970 births
Living people
Sportspeople from Bodø
Norwegian footballers
Eliteserien players
Eredivisie players
Allsvenskan players
Norway international footballers
Norwegian expatriate footballers
Expatriate footballers in the Netherlands
Expatriate footballers in China
Expatriate footballers in Sweden
Norwegian expatriate sportspeople in the Netherlands
Norwegian expatriate sportspeople in China
Norwegian expatriate sportspeople in Sweden
FK Bodø/Glimt players
Rosenborg BK players
NAC Breda players
GIF Sundsvall players
Norwegian football managers
Association football midfielders